William Sullivan Barnes, (16 June 1841 – 2 April 1912), was born in Boston and became a Unitarian minister.

Barnes was a practicing minister in various locations in Massachusetts before accepting a position with the  Unitarians of Montreal to succeed John Cordner, a distinguished minister with an established congregation of many leading citizens. He soon became recognized as an outstanding orator.

The Barnes ministry was highly geared toward culture and the visual arts and for this he became famous, receiving an honorary LLD from McGill University in 1909. However, he was weak in the area of denominational promotion and the congregation diminished during his tenure.

External links 
 
 Biography at the Dictionary of Canadian Biography Online

1841 births
1912 deaths
Canadian Protestant ministers and clergy
American emigrants to Canada